Fort Polk South is a census-designated place (CDP) in Vernon Parish, Louisiana, United States. The population was 11,000 at the 2000 census.

Fort Polk South is the larger principal city of the Fort Polk South-DeRidder CSA, a Combined Statistical Area that includes the Fort Polk South (Vernon Parish) and DeRidder (Beauregard Parish) micropolitan areas, which had a combined population of 85,517 at the 2000 census.

Geography
Fort Polk South is located at  (31.047003, -93.211213).

Demographics

As of the census of 2000, there were 11,000 people, 2,383 households, and 2,175 families residing in the CDP. The racial makeup of the CDP was 58.8% White, 27.7% African American, 0.9% Native American, 2.2% Asian, 0.5% Pacific Islander, 5.3% from other races, and 4.6% from two or more races. Hispanic or Latino of any race were 11.7% of the population.

There were 2,383 households, out of which 72.8% had children under the age of 18 living with them, 82.8% were married couples living together, 6.0% had a female householder with no husband present, and 8.7% were non-families. 8.3% of all households were made up of individuals, and none had someone living alone who was 65 years of age or older. The average household size was 3.45 and the average family size was 3.63.

In the CDP, the population was spread out, with 33.0% under the age of 18, 29.3% from 18 to 24, 35.9% from 25 to 44, 1.7% from 45 to 64, and 0.1% who were 65 years of age or older. The median age was 22 years. For every 100 females, there were 152.4 males. For every 100 females age 18 and over, there were 181.3 males.

The median income for a household in the CDP was $32,993, and the median income for a family was $33,463. Males had a median income of $20,855 versus $17,776 for females. The per capita income for the CDP was $12,176. About 8.7% of families and 10.8% of the population were below the poverty line, including 14.1% of those under age 18 and none of those age 65 or over.

Notable people
 Tiffany Hayes (b. 1989), WNBA player for the Atlanta Dream

References

Census-designated places in Louisiana
Census-designated places in Vernon Parish, Louisiana